Joshua Adolph Sanchez (born 1981) is an American businessman and politician serving as a member of the New Mexico Senate from the 30th district. Elected in 2020, he assumed office on January 19, 2021.

Early life and education 
Sanchez was born in Belen, New Mexico in 1981. He graduated from Belen High School, where he competed on the wrestling team. He also worked on his family's farm.

Career 
After graduating from high school, Sanchez worked in the construction industry before establishing his own business. For 15 years, Sanchez was also an employee of the Middle Rio Grande Conservancy District. In the 2020 Democratic primary, incumbent Senator Clemente Sanchez was defeated by Pamela Cordova. Sanchez defeated Cordova in the November general election. He assumed office on January 19, 2021.

External links 
 Campaign website

References 

Hispanic and Latino American state legislators in New Mexico
Living people
1981 births
People from Belen, New Mexico
Republican Party New Mexico state senators
Belen High School alumni
21st-century American politicians